Chen Feng (1916–1986) was a Chinese diplomat. He was born in Yangshan County, Guangdong. He was Ambassador of the People's Republic of China to Afghanistan (1965–1969), Burundi (1972–1977), Iceland (1978–1982) and Mauritius (1982–1984).

1916 births
1986 deaths
Ambassadors of China to Afghanistan
Ambassadors of China to Burundi
Ambassadors of China to Iceland
Ambassadors of China to Mauritius
Mayors of Nanning
Politicians from Qingyuan
People's Republic of China politicians from Guangdong